The Audi Type M was a large car first presented at the Berlin Motor Show in 1923 and produced by Audi between 1924 and 1927.

The vehicle had a six-cylinder in-line engine with 4,655 cc of displacement. The engine incorporated several innovative features including overhead valves. Power was transmitted to the rear wheels through a four-speed transmission. The engine had an eight-bearing crankshaft, forced lubrication with oil cooler and a thermostat-controlled water cooling. The car had two leaf-sprung solid axles and four wheel hydraulic brakes. It was the first Audi with four-wheel brakes.

The Type M's first presentation, at the 1923 Motor Show, was accompanied by a press release which boasted that "Audi is one of those German automakers that believes doing the job properly is more important than price" („Die Audi-Werke zählen zu jenen deutschen Automobilfabriken, welche die Preisfrage hinter die konstruktive Aufgabe zurückstellen“). This approach may have helped to win the car more admirers, but paying customers were harder to find. The Type M came with a manufacturer's recommended retail price of 22,300 Marks for a large six-light "Pullman-Limousine" bodied vehicle. The car was expensive and reportedly brought Audi very close to bankruptcy. 228 were produced, plus two prototypes.

Specifications

Sources
 Oswald, Werner: Deutsche Autos 1920-1945, Motorbuch Verlag Stuttgart, 10. Auflage (1996), 
 

1920s cars
Type M